The following are lists of schools:

 Lists of schools by country
 List of art schools
 List of boarding schools
 List of choir schools
 List of Christian Brothers schools
 List of democratic schools
 List of fictional schools
 List of forestry technical schools
 List of high schools producing multiple Olympic gold medalists
 List of hoshū jugyō kō (supplementary weekend Japanese schools)
 List of information schools
 List of library science schools
 List of medical schools
 List of Ministry of Foreign Affairs of Russia overseas schools
 List of Mofet schools
 List of Montessori schools
 List of music schools
 List of the oldest schools in the world
 List of pharmacy schools
 List of philosophy schools
 List of political schools
 List of psychological schools
 List of schools for the deaf
 List of schools for quantitative psychology
 List of schools of international relations
 List of schools of philosophy
 List of Sudbury schools
 List of summer schools of linguistics
 List of summer schools of nature sciences
 Lists of universities and colleges
 List of virtual schools

See also

 :Category:Schools of thought
 :Category:Lists of educational organizations